Gleydson Carvalho (25 April, 1982 – 7 August, 2015) was a Brazilian radio talk show host and journalist for Radio Liberdade FM. He was known for his attacks on local government corruption. Carvalho was killed after being shot in the head and chest multiple times while on air by unidentified gunmen.

Personal 
Gleydson Carvalho was born in Brazil on 25 April, 1982. During his career as a radio DJ, Carvalho came into prominence for frequently speaking out against political corruption during airtime. Carvalho was well known for his long-standing campaign against government corruption. Gleydson worked in Camocim, Ceará, Brazil.

During his school days, Gleydson studied, in Caucaia-Ce, at EEM Eliezer de Freitas Guimarães, was President of the Student Union (GEEF-Grêmio Estudantil Eliezer de Freitas) along with friends Alexsandro Bezerra, Aristoteles Aguiar, Rafael Braga, and among others , it was for the good and always for the maintenance of the rights of all.

Career 
Gleydson Carvalho was a radio talk show host for Radio Liberdade FM. Carvalho was known for professing his strong political views while hosting his show and had received many death threats on his Facebook page. His career was made by the amount of political views and opinions he put into his show. Gleydson Carvalho was so popular he had his own show at lunchtime.

Death 
On August 7, 2015, Carvalho was assassinated during a musical interlude as he was hosting a live broadcast at the Radio Liberdade FM in the Brazilian state of Ceará. According to the media, two men entered the station's offices during his midday segment and stated that they would like to place an ad. Shortly after, they overpowered the receptionist before gaining entry to Carvalho's recording studio, and once inside, the gunmen shot Carvalho five times (3 times in the head and twice in the chest). Carvalho died as he was taken to a nearby hospital. The killers fled on a white motorbike, but it was not long until the authorities found them.

On August 8, two suspects were taken into custody in connection of the killing, Francisco Antônio Carneiro Portela and Gisele Sousa do Nascmiento, though it is unknown to what extent their involvement went. Security footage from August 4, three days prior to the shooting, showed the perpetrators, who were believed to still be at large, identified as Tiago Lemos da Silva and Israel Marques de Sousa, also known by the nicknames "Jefferson", "Dudu", and "Baixinho", loitering in front of the radio station. Civil Police have put up a warrant for their arrest and consider Lemos and Marques prime suspects in the killing.

Context 
Gleydson Carvalho was the fourth journalist killed in Brazil in 2015. In March 5, 2015, Gerardo Ceferino Servian Coronel, also a radio journalist, had previously been fatally shot and his body dumped close to Ponta Porã, near the Brazil-Paraguay border. Internet journalist Evany José Metzker was found decapitated in Padre Paraíso, Minas Gerais on May 18, 2015. On May 22, another radio journalist, Djalma Santos da Conceição, was abducted from Governador Mangabeira and found dead with signs of torture the next day in Timbó, outside of Conceição da Feira, Bahia. All four murders remain unresolved. Committee to Protect Journalists reports that at least 16 journalists have been killed in the country since 2011, ranking Brazil eleventh on the CPJ's 2014 Global Impunity Index.

Impact 
Gleydson Carvalho was well known for his long-standing, vocal reporting about government corruption.  Carvalho's death sparked outrage and caused an uproar in the local community. Human rights groups in Brazil were outside of major urban centers around the country. Without Carvalho's knowing, he got these groups to fight for the journalists' lives that had been taken from them because of their jobs.

Reactions 
Irina Bokova, the director-general of UNESCO, said, "Journalists are the voices of the people and when violence is used to silence one of them, society as a whole suffers. I call on the authorities to investigate this crime and bring its perpetrators to court to be punished in keeping with Brazil's legal provisions."

A statement from Committee to Protect Journalists said, "Authorities must take action to combat a press freedom crisis that is violating the right of all Brazilians to be informed, not to mention ending journalists' lives."

References 

1982 births
2015 deaths
Assassinated Brazilian journalists
Brazilian radio personalities
Deaths by firearm in Brazil